The netball competition at the 2002 Commonwealth Games took place in Manchester, England from 25 July to 4 August 2002. Australia won the gold medal.

Results

Group stages

Group A

Final standings

Group B

Final standings

Play-offs

Semi-finals

Bronze-medal match

Final

Medallists

References

 
2002
netball
2002 in netball
International netball competitions hosted by England
netball